Sandke is a surname. Notable people with the surname include: 

Jordan Sandke (born  1946), American jazz trumpeter, cornetist, and fluegelhornist
Randy Sandke (born 1949), American jazz trumpeter and guitarist